Prof. Baldev Singh Bali (also known as B.S.Bali) is an Indian classical musician and Professor emeritus at the Institute of Music and Fine Arts Jammu where he also served as the Dean of the College and Head of the Music Faculty.

Family
Baldev Singh Bali was born to Surinder Singh Bali and Shanta Bali. His grandfather Kartar Singh Bali has served the Dogra rulers of his time as the military secretary as well as foreign affairs aid.

Musical training
His first music teacher was Ram Prashad Razdan and Pt. Dilip Chandra Vedi from whom he learned classical music for 10 years from 1957. In 1958, he learned Kirana gharana gayaki from Bhimsen Joshi when he came to Jammu for a Radio engagement. He has been a part of several music conferences and performances with Pt. Bhimsen Joshi. He was also trained in Dhrupad, Dhamar, Khayal, Thumri, Tappa, and Bhajans.

Education
Baldev Singh Bali did his B.A. from the University of Jammu and Kashmir and Prabhakar (Honours in Hindi) from the University of Punjab. He completed his Masters in music from Gandharva Mahavidyalaya Mandal in Pune, Maharashtra.

Career
He joined the Institute of Music and Fine Arts Jammu as an instructor for vocal Indian classical music. In 1972 he was promoted as a Senior Instructor and later to the position of Principal in 1993. He retired in 1998 as ex-Dean of the College and Head of the Music Faculty at University of Jammu. He has been an ex-member on Advisory Panel of All India Radio and an expert member on the interview Board of the Institute of Music and Fine Arts constituted by the Jammu and Kashmir Academy of Art, Culture and Languages. He also served on the panel of experts in the subject of education at Kurukshetra University where he was one of the panel advisor to Northern Command for recruitment of music faculty.

In 1994, he was entrusted by Shree Mata Vaishno Devi Shrine Board to produce Music Cassette sung by Bharat Ratna Pt. Bhimsen Joshi. The Music Cassette has been released by H.M.V.

Accolades
 State Award from K. V. Krishna Rao for contribution in the field of Music in 1996
 Nehru Centenary Award by Justice R. P. Sethi of Jammu and Kashmir High Court in 1989
 Silver Medal by the then Prime Minister of the J & K Sheikh Mohd. Abdullah in 1952

References

Living people
1940 births
Indian classical musicians
Indian ghazal singers
University of Jammu alumni
Academic staff of the University of Jammu
University of the Punjab alumni
Kirana gharana
People from Jammu district
20th-century Indian classical singers
21st-century Indian classical singers
Singers from Jammu and Kashmir
Ghazal singers
Indian music people
Academic staff of Kurukshetra University
20th-century Indian male classical singers
21st-century Indian male classical singers
Indian radio personalities